Limpopo is a province in South Africa.

Limpopo may also refer to:
Limpopo National Park, a wildlife conservation park in Mozambique
Limpopo River, a river in southern Africa
Limpopo (cricket team), a former first-class cricket team in Limpopo, South Africa
1490 Limpopo, an asteroid named for the Limpopo River
Red Elvises or Limpopo, a Russian-American folk rock band from California

See also
Great Limpopo Transfrontier Park, a peace park in the process of being formed between Mozambique, South Africa and Zimbabwe.